Being Jacques Chirac is a 2006 film by Karl Zero and Michel Royer. It has been produced by the same team which produced March of the Penguins.

It is a mockumentary which is a kind of unauthorized biography of Jacques Chirac, based on archival footage, and told at the first person (the voice of the French president is provided by imitator Didier Gustin). The main comic effect comes from the contradictions between the various speeches of the French President.

The title comes from the title of the French-language version of Being John Malkovich.

Award
César Award, Best Documentary

References

External links 
 

2006 documentary films
2006 films
Documentary films about politicians
French documentary films
Jacques Chirac
2000s French films